The Yukon Legislative Assembly is the legislative assembly for Yukon, Canada. Unique among Canada's three territories, the Yukon Legislative Assembly is the only territorial legislature which is organized along political party lines. In contrast, in Nunavut and the Northwest Territories, their legislative assemblies are elected on a non-partisan basis and operate on a consensus government model.

Each member represents one electoral district, elected through first-past-the-post voting. Members of the Legislative Assembly are sworn in by the commissioner of Yukon.

History
From 1900 to 1978, the elected legislative body in Yukon was the Yukon Territorial Council, a body which did not act as the primary government, but was a non-partisan advisory body to the commissioner of the Yukon. Following the passage of the Yukon Elections Act in 1977, the Territorial Council was replaced by the current Legislative Assembly, which was elected for the first time in the 1978 Yukon general election.

Seating plan

Current members

Italicized text indicates a member of cabinet. Bold text indicates a party leader. Both indicates the Premier of Yukon

Party standings

See also
List of speakers of the Yukon Legislative Assembly
List of Yukon general elections
List of Yukon territorial electoral districts

References

Legislative Assembly

Yukon
Yukon
1978 establishments in Yukon